Michael Ted Levin (born October 20, 1978) is an American politician and attorney serving as the U.S. representative for California's 49th congressional district since 2019. A member of the Democratic Party, he represents most of northern coastal San Diego County, as well as part of southern Orange County.

Early life and education 
Levin was born in Inglewood, California, and raised in Lake Forest, California, in South Orange County. His mother is Mexican-American and his father is Jewish. Levin was raised in both the Jewish and Catholic faiths. He attended Loyola High School in Los Angeles before attending Stanford University. At Stanford, Levin served as president of the student body. He attended law school at Duke University School of Law before returning to Orange County.

Early career
Levin co-founded CleanTech OC, a clean energy trade association in Orange County, and was profiled in an OC Metro "40 Under 40" piece for his work at FlexEnergy, a company that developed a technology to capture and use methane from landfills and wastewater treatment facilities. He was the director of government affairs at FuelCell Energy from 2014 to 2017. He also served as vice president of Better Energy Systems, a consumer-facing cleantech startup based in Berkeley, California, and on the board of directors of the Center for Sustainable Energy, an environmental organization based in San Diego. In this capacity, Levin opposed the redevelopment of Encina Power Station, arguing that "the proposed Carlsbad plant contradicts the priorities that California has established to reduce pollution across our state as it will use combustion to generate power."

Levin served as the executive director of the Democratic Party of Orange County. He later served on the National Finance Committee for Hillary Clinton's 2016 campaign for President.

U.S. House of Representatives

Elections

2018 

On March 8, 2017, Levin announced his candidacy for United States Congress in California's 49th congressional district to replace incumbent Representative Darrell Issa. The district had historically been one of Southern California's more Republican districts, but redistricting after the 2010 census cut out most of its heavily Republican inland portion, making it significantly more competitive. Issa had nearly been defeated in 2016 as Hillary Clinton carried the district.

At a town hall event that Issa held on March 11, 2017, Levin publicly confronted Issa and mentioned a book he had sent Issa in 2016, Climate Change for Beginners. Levin charged that Issa's solution to climate problems "is to build more natural gas plants and to keep the nuclear energy plants online for longer.... I think that's an unfathomable proposal for a progressive and environmentally-friendly place like San Diego." On January 10, 2018, Issa announced his retirement.

Levin campaigned with a platform focused on energy and environmental issues.

Due to the competitive character of the race as well as the absence of an incumbent, there were 16 candidates on the ballot in the primary. The large number of candidates in the nonpartisan blanket primary led to fears that Democrats would be locked out of the general election.

In the June 5 primary, Levin came in second to Republican State Board of Equalization chair Diane Harkey and advanced to the general election. This assured that the district would be represented by someone from the Orange County portion of the district, though the 49th is a San Diego district by weight of population. Levin is from San Juan Capistrano, while Harkey is from nearby Dana Point.

Barack Obama endorsed Levin as well as other candidates.

2020 

In the 2020 general election, Levin defeated Republican Brian Maryott with 53.1% of the vote.

2022 

In the 2022 general election, Levin again defeated Republican Brian Maryott, this time with 52.6% of the vote.

Tenure
As of October 2022, Levin had voted in line with President Joe Biden's stated position 100% of the time.

Committee assignments

Committee on Natural Resources
Subcommittee on Energy and Mineral Resources
Subcommittee on Water, Oceans and Wildlife
Committee on Veterans Affairs
Subcommittee on Economic Opportunity (Ranking Member)
 Subcommittee on Health

Caucus memberships 

 Congressional Hispanic Caucus
 Congressional Progressive Caucus
Sustainable Energy and Environment Coalition
Freshmen Working Group on Addiction
Gun Violence Prevention Task Force 
Safe Climate Caucus
California Aerospace Caucus
End Corruption Caucus
 House Pro-Choice Caucus

Political positions

Abortion

Levin has a 100% rating from NARAL Pro-Choice America and an F rating from the Susan B. Anthony List for his voting record on abortion-related issues. He has emphasized his support for "a woman's right to a safe, legal abortion".

Climate change

Levin has prioritized addressing climate change, which has garnered attention from national media outlets covering energy and environmental issues. During the 2022 elections, these outlets considered his reelection bid a high-profile race. Levin voted for the Inflation Reduction Act of 2022, the largest climate policy ever passed by Congress.

Levin has expressed support for the Green New Deal, a comprehensive plan to address climate change.

Inflation 
Levin supported the Inflation Reduction Act of 2022.

Infrastructure 
Levin supported the Infrastructure Investment and Jobs Act, a bill to address the country's infrastructure needs through investments in rebuilding and modernization. The legislation also funds new initiatives aimed at enhancing the resilience of infrastructure against the effects of climate change and expanding the reach of broadband infrastructure. It passed with bipartisan support.

Levin is a proponent of moving the Pacific Surfliner railway line, which runs along the coastal bluffs of Del Mar, to a safer location. He is actively pushing for additional Infrastructure Investment and Jobs Act funding to be allocated for a rail tunnel under Del Mar, with the goal of completing the project by 2035.

Gun policy

In 2022, Levin voted for H.R. 1808: Assault Weapons Ban of 2022, aimed at banning the sale and distribution of certain types of firearms. He also supported the Bipartisan Safer Communities Act, which was passed and signed into law, a comprehensive bill aimed at strengthening gun safety regulations. This bill was widely recognized as a significant step forward in addressing gun violence, with CNN calling it "the most significant new federal gun safety measure in decades."

Voting rights

Levin voted for the For the People Act, a bill intended to expand voting rights.

Personal life
Levin lives in San Juan Capistrano with his wife, Chrissy, and their two children.

Electoral history

See also
List of Hispanic and Latino Americans in the United States Congress
List of Jewish members of the United States Congress

References

External links

Congressman Mike Levin official U.S. House website
Mike Levin for Congress campaign website

|-

1978 births
American environmentalists
American politicians of Mexican descent
Candidates in the 2018 United States elections
Hispanic and Latino American members of the United States Congress
Jewish members of the United States House of Representatives
Living people
Democratic Party members of the United States House of Representatives from California
People from Orange County, California
21st-century American Jews
Duke University School of Law alumni